The 1916 Delaware Fightin' Blue Hens football team was an American football team that represented Delaware College (later renamed the University of Delaware) as an independent during the 1916 college football season. In their ninth season under head coach William McAvoy, the Blue Hens compiled a 4–3–1 record and were outscored by a total of 66 to 60. Michael J. Fidance was the team captain. The team played its home games at Frazer Field in Newark, Delaware.

Schedule

References

Delaware
Delaware Fightin' Blue Hens football seasons
Delaware Fightin' Blue Hens football